Disks large homolog 5 is a protein that in humans is encoded by the DLG5 gene.

Function 

This gene encodes a member of the family of discs large (DLG) homologs, a subset of the membrane-associated guanylate kinase (MAGUK) superfamily. The MAGUK proteins are composed of a catalytically inactive guanylate kinase domain, in addition to PDZ and SH3 domains, and are thought to function as scaffolding molecules at sites of cell-cell contact. The protein encoded by this gene localizes to the plasma membrane and cytoplasm, and interacts with components of adherens junctions and the cytoskeleton. It is proposed to function in the transmission of extracellular signals to the cytoskeleton and in the maintenance of epithelial cell structure. Alternative splice variants have been described but their biological nature has not been determined.

Interactions 

DLG5 has been shown to interact with SORBS3.

References

Further reading